is a passenger railway station located in the Kurihira neighborhood of  Asao-ku, Kawasaki, Kanagawa, Japan and operated by the private railway operator Odakyu Electric Railway.

Lines

Station layout
The station consists of two opposed side platforms serving two tracks, with an elevated station building over the platforms and tracks.

Platforms

History
Kurihira Station was opened on June 1, 1974. In the 2002, the station became a stop for the Tama Express, and from 2004 for the Section Semi-Express trains. The station building was remodeled in 2006.

Passenger statistics
In fiscal 2019, the station was used by an average of 24,606 passengers daily.

The passenger figures for previous years are as shown below.

Surrounding area 
 Kurihira Post Office
Kawasaki City Kurigidai Elementary School
Kawasaki City Shiratori Junior High School

See also
 List of railway stations in Japan

References

External links

  

Railway stations in Kanagawa Prefecture
Railway stations in Japan opened in 1974
Stations of Odakyu Electric Railway
Railway stations in Kawasaki, Kanagawa